The House of Commons Standing Committee on  Health (HESA) is a standing committee of the House of Commons of Canada.

Mandate
The mandate and management of Health Canada and its internal bodies:
Pest Management Regulatory Agency
Oversight of other agencies reporting through the Minister of Health to the Parliament of Canada
Canadian Institutes of Health Research
Patented Medicine Prices Review Board
Public Health Agency of Canada
Canadian Food Inspection Agency

Membership

Subcommittees
Subcommittee on Agenda and Procedure (SHES)
Subcommittee on Sports-Related Concussions in Canada (SCSC)

References

External links
 Standing Committee on Health (HESA)

Health
Parliamentary committees on Healthcare